WNOI (103.9 FM) is a radio station licensed to Flora, Illinois, United States. The station airs an adult contemporary format, and is currently owned by H & R Communications, Inc.

References

External links
WNOI's website

NOI
Mainstream adult contemporary radio stations in the United States